Menegazzia tarkinea is a rare species of foliose lichen in the family Parmeliaceae. It occurs in North West Tasmania (Australia).

Taxonomy
The species was described as new to science by lichenologist Gintaras Kantvilas in 2012. The type specimen was collected along the Savage River Pipeline Road, where it was found at the edge of a rainforest growing on Nothofagus cunninghamii. The specific epithet refers to the Tarkine, an area containing the biodiverse Savage River National Park in northwest Tasmania.

Description
The thallus surface lacks isidia and soredia, and has only a few roundish perforations, which are about 0.2–0.5 mm wide. Ascospores are ovoid to ellipsoid with dimensions of 40–52 by 28–34 μm.

The secondary chemicals found in Menegazzia tarkinea are atranorin, lecanoric acid, norstictic acid, and connorstictic acid. The expected results of standard chemical spot tests on the medulla are K+ (yellow/red), P+ (orange), C−, and KC−.

Menegazzia tarkinea is a very rare Tasmanian endemic species. It is only known to occur at the type locality. A lookalike species is M. ramulicola, which has a similar compact growth form and similar substrate preference, but does not share the same unique chemistry as Menegazzia tarkinea.

See also
List of Menegazzia species

References

tarkinea
Lichen species
Lichens described in 2012
Lichens of Australia
Taxa named by Gintaras Kantvilas